Hylorus armatus is a species of beetle in the family Cerambycidae, the only species in the genus Hylorus.

References

Compsocerini